= Kord Tappeh =

- Location in Iran
- Coordinates: 38°45′29″N 47°32′04″E
- Country: Iran
- Province: Ardabil Province
- Time zone: UTC+3:30 (IRST)
  - Summer (DST): UTC+4:30 (IRDT)

Kord Tappeh is a village in the Ardabil Province of Iran.
